In algebra, the rational root theorem (or rational root test, rational zero theorem, rational zero test or  theorem) states a constraint on rational solutions of a polynomial equation

Solutions of the equation are also called roots or zeroes of the polynomial on the left side.

  is an integer factor of the constant term , and

  is an integer factor of the leading coefficient .

The rational root theorem is a special case (for a single linear factor) of Gauss's lemma on the factorization of polynomials. The integral root theorem is the special case of the rational root theorem when the leading coefficient is .

Application

The theorem is used to find all rational roots of a polynomial, if any. It gives a finite number of possible fractions which can be checked to see if they are roots. If a rational root  is found, a linear polynomial  can be factored out of the polynomial using polynomial long division, resulting in a polynomial of lower degree whose roots are also roots of the original polynomial.

Cubic equation

The general cubic equation

with integer coefficients has three solutions in the complex plane. If the rational root test finds no rational solutions, then the only way to express the solutions algebraically uses cube roots. But if the test finds a rational solution , then factoring out  leaves a quadratic polynomial whose two roots, found with the quadratic formula, are the remaining two roots of the cubic, avoiding cube roots.

Proofs

Elementary proof

Let  with  

Suppose  for some coprime :

To clear denominators, multiply both sides by : 

Shifting the  term to the right side and factoring out  on the left side produces:

Thus,  divides .

On the other hand, shifting the  term to the right side and factoring out  on the left side produces:

Reasoning as before, it follows that  divides .

Proof using Gauss's lemma

Should there be a nontrivial factor dividing all the coefficients of the polynomial, then one can divide by the greatest common divisor of the coefficients so as to obtain a primitive polynomial in the sense of Gauss's lemma; this does not alter the set of rational roots and only strengthens the divisibility conditions. This argument shows that more generally, any irreducible factor of  can be supposed to have integer coefficients, and leading and constant coefficients dividing the corresponding coefficients of .

Examples

First

In the polynomial

any rational root fully reduced would have to have a numerator that divides evenly into 1 and a denominator that divides evenly into 2. Hence the only possible rational roots are ±1/2 and ±1; since neither of these equates the polynomial to zero, it has no rational roots.

Second
In the polynomial

the only possible rational roots would have a numerator that divides 6 and a denominator that divides 1, limiting the possibilities to ±1, ±2, ±3, and ±6. Of these, 1, 2, and –3 equate the polynomial to zero, and hence are its rational roots. (In fact these are its only roots since a cubic has only three roots; in general, a polynomial could have some rational and some irrational roots.)

Third

Every rational root of the polynomial

must be among the numbers
 
These 8 root candidates  can be tested by evaluating , for example using Horner's method.

This process may be made more efficient: if , it can be used to shorten the list of remaining candidates. Applying the rational root theorem thus yields the  possible roots , so that 

If  rational roots are found, Horner's method will also yield a polynomial of degree  whose roots, together with the rational roots, are exactly the roots of the original polynomial. If none of the candidates is a solution, there can be no rational solution.

See also

Fundamental theorem of algebra
Integrally closed domain
Descartes' rule of signs
Gauss–Lucas theorem
Properties of polynomial roots
Content (algebra)
Eisenstein's criterion

Notes

References
Charles D. Miller, Margaret L. Lial, David I. Schneider: Fundamentals of College Algebra. Scott & Foresman/Little & Brown Higher Education, 3rd edition 1990, pp. 216–221
Phillip S. Jones, Jack D. Bedient: The historical roots of elementary mathematics. Dover Courier Publications 1998, pp. 116–117 
Ron Larson: Calculus: An Applied Approach. Cengage Learning 2007, pp. 23–24 

External links

RationalRootTheorem at PlanetMath
 Another proof that nth roots of integers are irrational, except for perfect nth powers by Scott E. Brodie
The Rational Roots Test at purplemath.com

Theorems about polynomials
Root-finding algorithms